David Cluett (2 August 1965 – 17 July 2005) was a Maltese professional football goalkeeper.

Cluett is regarded as one of the best goalkeepers in Maltese football. His best years were those at Floriana F.C. with whom he won a number of honours.

Melita FC
Cluett started his career with St Julians side Melita F.C., in 1979. Cluett spent one season there.

Floriana FC
In 1986, he moved to Floriana F.C. During his time with the Greens' Cluett fast became a fan favorite, his dominating figure between the posts helped lead the club to a new era of honours. During his 13-year spell with Floriana he went on to win all domestic honours. His best phase with the club was most definitely between 1992 and 1994 winning the triple crown in the first season. The following season Cluett went on to set a national record, 736 minutes without conceding a goal, Floriana went on to win three domestic honours that season.

Last footballing years
After Floriana, David Cluett had two short spells with Birkirkara F.C. and Gozo F.C. before returning to play for Floriana. Following his retirement from football Cluett worked with Msida Saint-Joseph F.C. as a goalkeeping coach.

National team
On 29 March 1987 he made his international debut in a 2–2 draw against Portugal. In total Cluett won 69 caps for Malta, the last on being on 27 March 1996 in 1–0 away defeat to Macedonia.

Death
On 17 July 2005 Cluett died after a long battle against a serious illness.

Honours

Floriana F.C.

 Premier League: 1992–93
 F.A. Trophy: 1992–93, 1993–94
 Super Cup: 1992–93
 Super 5 Cup: 1993–94, 1994–95, 1995–96, 1997–98
 Lowenbrau Cup: 1993–94

Individual

 National Record: 736 Minutes without conceding a goal.

External links
 

1965 births
2005 deaths
Maltese footballers
Malta international footballers
Melita F.C. players
Floriana F.C. players
Birkirkara F.C. players
Association football goalkeepers